Łukasz Słonina (born 5 June 1989) is a Polish biathlete. He competed at the Biathlon World Championships 2013 in Nove Mesto na Morave, in sprint and relay. He competed at the 2014 Winter Olympics in Sochi, in the individual contest.

References

External links
 
 
 
 
 

1989 births
Living people
Polish male biathletes
Biathletes at the 2014 Winter Olympics
Olympic biathletes of Poland
Place of birth missing (living people)